Frédéric Maillot is a French politician who was elected to represent Réunion's 6th constituency in the 2022 legislative election. Maillot has served as vice president of the Regional Council of Réunion.

Biography 
Maillot was raised in a working-class family in Le Chaudron, Saint-Denis, Réunion.

2022 National Assembly election 
In the 2022 National Assembly election, Maillot ran to represent Réunion's 6th constituency. He ran as a candidate of Rassemblement Réunionnais, a coalition of legislative candidates affiliated with the left-wing New Ecologic and Social People's Union (NUPES) coalition.

References 

Living people
1980s births
21st-century French politicians
Réunionnais socialists
Members of the National Assembly (France)
Candidates for the 2022 French legislative election
Deputies of the 16th National Assembly of the French Fifth Republic
People from Saint-Denis, Réunion